Slobodan Šiljak (1881 in Pljevlja – December 5, 1943 in Pljevlja) was a Montenegrin priest in the Serbian Orthodox Church who was sainted by the church in 2005.

Šiljak studied theology in Prizren. He served as a military chaplain in the Balkan Wars. Šiljak was executed by a local Yugoslav Partisan unit during World War II on December 5, 1943 as an "enemy of the people". He was proclaimed a saint by the Serbian Orthodox Church in May 2005 in Bosnia and Herzegovina's Žitomislić Monastery despite protests by groups from Pljevlja that he was a war criminal. Milosava Strunjaš has come forward claiming that Šiljak was responsible for the death of her father Rajko Cerović.

References

1881 births
1943 deaths
20th-century Serbian people
Serbian saints of the Eastern Orthodox Church
Serbian Orthodox clergy
Montenegrin military personnel of the Balkan Wars
Montenegrin people of World War II
Serbian military personnel of the Balkan Wars
Serbian people of World War II
Serbs of Montenegro
People from Pljevlja